Dave Shade (March 3, 1902 – June 23, 1983) was an American boxer who was active from 1918 to the 1935 and amassed a total of nearly 250 bouts fought during the course of his career. His famous low crouching bob-and-weave style earned him a reputation as one of the cleverest boxers of his time period. Although Shade never captured a world title, he fared very well against the best boxers of his era including the likes of Mickey Walker, Jack Britton, Maxie Rosenbloom, Len Harvey and Jimmy Slattery. Shade was inducted into the International Boxing Hall of Fame in 2011.

Professional boxing record
All information in this section is derived from BoxRec, unless otherwise stated.

Official Record

All newspaper decisions are officially regarded as "no decision" bouts and are not counted in the win/loss/draw column.

Unofficial record

Record with the inclusion of newspaper decisions in the win/loss/draw column.

References

External links 
 
 Cyber Boxing Zone Profile - Dave Shade

Boxers from California
Sportspeople from Vallejo, California
International Boxing Hall of Fame inductees
1902 births
1983 deaths
American male boxers
Welterweight boxers